Tom Egbers (18 October 1957 in Almelo) is a Dutch journalist of Irish descent, writer and TV presenter (Studio Sport) since 1985. He studied at the School voor de Journalistiek in Utrecht, and was employed by Studio Sport (NOS) in 1984 as presenter. Between 1990 and 1992 Egbers worked for Veronica. He has written a book, The Black Meteor, about black footballer Steve Mokone that has been made into the film The Black Meteor.

References 

1957 births
Living people
Dutch television presenters
Dutch sports journalists
Dutch sportswriters
Dutch association football commentators
People from Almelo